The  is an electric multiple unit (EMU) train type operated by the private railway operator Nankai Electric Railway in Japan on Southern Premium limited express services between  and  since September 2011. Two four-car trainsets were delivered, replacing the older 10000 series sets.

Design
The new trains feature "Plasmacluster" air-purification technology developed by Sharp Corporation, representing the first use in a private operator (i.e. non-JR) train in Japan.

Operations
 Southern
 Semboku Liner (sometimes substituted for 11000 series)

Formation
, the fleet consists of two four-car sets, formed as follows, with two motored ("M") cars and two non-powered intermediate trailer ("T") cars, and car 1 at the Wakayamashi end.

The two end cars are each fitted with one PT7144-B single-arm pantograph.

Interior
Car 1 has a universal access toilet.

History
Two four-car sets were delivered from the Tokyu Car Corporation (now Japan Transport Engineering Company) factory in Yokohama in February 2011. The trains entered service on 1 September 2011.

See also

 Semboku 12000 series, a derivative operated by the Semboku Rapid Railway on Semboku Liner services since January 2017

References

External links

 Nankai Electric Railway 12000 series Southern Premium 

Electric multiple units of Japan
Train-related introductions in 2011
Nankai Electric Railway rolling stock
Tokyu Car multiple units
1500 V DC multiple units of Japan